Chaplin v Hicks [1911] 2 KB 786 is an English contract law case, concerning the right to damages for loss of a chance after a breach of contract.

Facts
Seymour Hicks, a well-known actor and theatrical manager, invited women to submit their photographs to compete in a beauty contest where the winners would be chosen by the readers of one newspaper. He promised to give engagements as actresses to the winners. Ms Chaplin submitted her photograph and came first in her section, which entitled her to be considered for one of the twelve finalists. The notice reached her too late, and she was not able to make the appointment with Mr Hicks. She sued Mr Hicks for damages for breach of contract to compensate her for the loss of a chance to be selected for an engagement.

Judgment
The Court of Appeal upheld a £100 award for the loss of the chance at winning the contest, awarded by the jury.

Vaughan Williams LJ dismissed the arguments that the damages were either (1) too remote or (2) unassessable.

Notes

English contract case law
1911 in British law
1911 in case law
Court of Appeal (England and Wales) cases